Downtown Rockers is the sixth studio album by American rock band Tom Tom Club, released on Nacional Records.

Reception
The editorial staff at AllMusic Guide gave the album four out of five stars, with reviewer Fred Thomas writing, "every song feeling more natural, relaxed, and groovy than the last".

Track listing
All songs written by Chris Frantz, Bruce Martin, Pablo Martin and Tina Weymouth
"Downtown Rockers" – 4:08
"Won't Give You Up" – 4:29
"You Make Me Rock and Roll" – 4:17
"Kissin' Antonio" – 3:43
"Sweets to the Sweet" – 4:34
"Downtown Rockers" (Ed Stasium E-Dub Mix) – 6:35
"Downtown Rockers" (Arthur Baker Superstar DJ Mix) – 7:35
"Kissin' Antonio" (Entro & Ginseng Short Mix) – 5:44
"Kissin' Antonio" (DJ Latin Bitman Mix) – 3:47

Personnel
Tom Tom Club
Chris Frantz – artwork, drums, percussion, production, vocals
Bruce Martin – keyboards, percussion
Pablo Martin – guitar
Tina Weymouth – artwork, bass guitar, overdub engineering, percussion engineering, production, synthesizer, tambourine, vocal engineering, vocals

Additional personnel
Adam Ayan – mastering
Tyler Bird – engineering, mixing, vocal engineering
Victoria Clamp – vocals
Egan Frantz – package design
Ed Stasium – mixing

References

External links

2012 albums
Nacional Records albums
Tom Tom Club albums